The Hungarian Tennis Championships originally known as the Hungarian International Championships (in Hungarian:Nemzeti Teniszbajnokság, Magyar Országos Teniszbajnokság or abbreviated to tenisz ob)  is a professional tennis tournament played on outdoor clay courts. It is currently part of the official Tennis Calendar of Hungary of the Hungarian Tennis Association and is a gentlemen's and ladies' event.

History
It is the fourth oldest tennis tournament of the world, which is held annually since its establishment. The first championships entitled as the Hungary's Lawn Tennis Championships were arranged on June 16, 1894 in Balatonfüred by the Stefánia Yacht Club. It was a coeducated tournament thus the first "men"'s singles trophy was awarded to Austrian countess Paulina von Pálffy. The next year the women's roster was distinguished and the men's, women's doubles and in 1909 the mixed doubles were added. In 1899 the tournament moved to Budapest and was organized by the Budapest Lawn Tennis Club. In 1903 the first unofficial international competition was held and subsequently became a standalone championship. In 1907 the Hungarian Lawn Tennis Association was formed as a subsidiary of the Hungarian Athletics Club thus the latter's name was included as the Annual HAC Tennis Championships (later the governing body was shortened to Hungarian Tennis Association).  The hard court came into use when the National Indoors Championships were distinguished in 1927 (fedett pályás ob). The same year red clay was introduced as a new surface beside the already existing grass courts. Traditionally the winner of the outdoors championships is considered the Hungarian (National) champion. In the beginning the tournament accepted foreign entries but after 1924 the Hungarian International Championships served as a diverse event while only Hungarian players could possibly go for the national title. After World War II the international branch went defunct and  only the nationals were held. Thus this tournament did and does not qualify as an open on ATP standards and no points are awarded for the results. The location of the event is determined each year, which allows several clubs and cities to host it outside the capital Budapest including Pécs, Szeged and Hódmezővásárhely. The date also varies to fit the schedule of other events but to be suitable for open air playing thus it takes place between May and end of September.

Past finals

Men

Statistics
Hungarian Champions

Eternal Champions (honorary title): Béla von Kehrling, József Asbóth, István Gulyás
Longest winning streaks: Béla von Kehrling (1912-1914 and 1920-1932, 16yrs), István Gulyás (1957–1968, 12yrs)
Triple consecutive title holders:Tibor Daniel (1896–1898), Béla von Kehrling (1912–1914), József Asbóth (1939–40,1942), István Gulyás (1957–1959), Balázs Taróczy (1973–1975), Attila Balázs (2008–2013)

See also
 Hungary Davis Cup team

Notes

 The tournament was won by Countess Paulina von Pálffy since the first tournament was coeducated.
 subsequent governor of Hungary Miklós Horthy also participated in the event
 The tournament was not held from 1915 to 1918 because of World War I.
 The tournament was not held in 1941 because of lack of tennis balls.
 Note that Emil Gabrovitz and Emil Gábori is the same person. He won 3 singles titles altogether under the two different names.

Merged with the international championship. The winner is considered the national champion.

References

External links
 Hungarian Tennis Association

Recurring sporting events established in 1894
Tennis
Tennis tournaments in Hungary
Exhibition tennis tournaments
Clay court tennis tournaments